Hendrik Josef Wüst (born 19 July 1975) is a German politician currently serving as Minister-President of the state of North Rhine-Westphalia. He is a member of the Christian democratic and liberal-conservative CDU. In October 2021 he succeeded Armin Laschet as state chairman of his party. Under Wüst's leadership, his party won the highest vote share in the 2022 North Rhine-Westphalia state election.

Early life and education
Wüst was born in 1975 in the town of Rhede in North Rhine-Westphalia. In 1995, having obtained his Abitur, he began reading law at the University of Münster, qualifying as a lawyer in 2003.

Political career

Beginnings
At the age of 15, Wüst co-founded the local branch of Junge Union (JU), the youth wing of the Christian Democratic Union (CDU), in his hometown. In 1994, he was elected to the city council of Rhede. He served as chairman of the JU in North Rhine-Westphalia from 2000 until 2006, which made him part of the CDU leadership in the state under chairman Jürgen Rüttgers.

Member of the State Parliament, 2005–present
Wüst was first elected to the State Parliament of North Rhine-Westphalia in the 2005 elections. In addition to his parliamentary work, he was employed by public affairs agency Eutop from 2000 until 2005.

From 2006, Wüst served as the secretary general of the CDU in the state, under Rüttgers’ leadership. In 2010, he resigned from the post of secretary general. He took this step after it became known that the party had given preferential access to Rüttgers, then Minister-President of North Rhine-Westphalia, in return for payments.

From 2010 until 2017, Wüst then worked for the North Rhine-Westphalia state chapter of the German Newspaper Publishers Association (BDZV) and for a private broadcaster.

Following the 2017 state elections in North Rhine-Westphalia, Wüst was part of the CDU team in the negotiations with Christian Lindner’s FDP on a coalition agreement. He led his party's delegation in the working group on economic affairs and energy policy; his co-chair of the FDP was Andreas Pinkwart.

In 2017, Wüst was appointed State Minister for Transport in the cabinet of Armin Laschet.

Minister President of North Rhine-Westphalia, 2021–present
On 5 October 2021, it was reported that Wüst would receive the endorsement of Laschet to succeed him as Minister President of North Rhine-Westphalia and state chairman of the CDU. On 23 October, he was elected to the state chairmanship of his party.

On 27 October 2021, Wüst was elected Minister President of North Rhine-Westphalia by the state parliament.

As one of the state's representatives at the Bundesrat since 2021, Wüst serves on the Committee on Foreign Affairs and the Defense. During his first year as Minister-President, he also served as Commissioner of the Federal Republic of Germany for Cultural Affairs under the Treaty on Franco-German Cooperation.

Wüst was nominated by his party as delegate to the Federal Convention for the purpose of electing the President of Germany in 2022.

In May 2022, the CDU received the highest vote share in the 2022 North Rhine-Westphalia state election, making Wüst the frontrunner to continue as the state's Minister-President.

Political positions 
According to Westdeutscher Rundfunk, Wüst is part of the conservative wing of the CDU. In 2007, a group of conservative politicians, including Wüst and the future Minister President of Bavaria Markus Söder, published a white paper entitled  ('Modern civic conservatism'), which was described as a "token of insubordination" by Frankfurter Allgemeine Zeitung.

Other activities

Corporate boards
RAG-Stiftung, Ex-Officio Member of the Board of Trustees (since 2021)

Nonprofit organizations
 Peace of Westphalia Prize, Member of the Jury (since 2022)
 Development and Peace Foundation (SEF), Ex-Officio Chair of the Board of Trustees (since 2021)
 Heinz Kühn Foundation, Ex-Officio Chair of the Board of Trustees (since 2021)
 Cultural Foundation of the German States (KdL), Member of the Council (since 2021)
 German Federal Cultural Foundation, Member of the Board of Trustees
 Kunststiftung NRW, Ex-Officio Chairman of the Board of Trustees (since 2021)
 North Rhine-Westphalian Foundation for the Environment and Development (SUE), Ex-Officio chairman of the board (since 2021)
 Brost Foundation, Member of the Board of Trustees
 Deutsches Museum, Member of the Board of Trustees

References 

1975 births
People from Rhede
University of Münster alumni
Christian Democratic Union of Germany politicians
Members of the Landtag of North Rhine-Westphalia
21st-century German lawyers
Living people